Pheidole sulcaticeps is a species of ant in the subfamily Myrmicinae.

Subspecies
Pheidole sulcaticeps punensis Forel, 1902 - India
Pheidole sulcaticeps sulcaticeps Forel, 1902 - Bangladesh, Sri Lanka, China
Pheidole sulcaticeps yeensis Forel, 1902
Pheidole sulcaticeps vellicans Forel, 1911 - Sri Lanka

References

External links

 at antwiki.org
Animaldiversity.org
Itis.org

sulcaticeps
Hymenoptera of Asia
Insects described in 1902
Insect pests of millets